The 1934 Swiss Grand Prix was a Grand Prix motor race run to the 750 kg formula, held over 70 laps of Circuit Bremgarten, near Bern, on 26 August 1934. It was supported earlier in the day by the voiturette-class Prix de Berne, held over 15 laps of the same circuit. The main event was won by Hans Stuck in an Auto Union, who led the race from the start. While Stuck's pole position had been earned by setting the fastest lap time in practice, starting positions following the German were decided by ballot. The voiturette race was won by Dick Seaman driving an MG, having started from the ninth row of the grid. The meeting was marred by the fatal accident of British driver Hugh Hamilton on the final lap of the Grand Prix.

Classification

Großer Preis der Schweiz

References

Swiss Grand Prix
Swiss Grand Prix
Grand Prix